Nathan Joseph Wannacot, known by his stage name Whitey, is an English songwriter, musician, multi-instrumentalist and soundtrack composer. He works primarily in the alternative pop field, bringing in elements of pop, rock, classical and electronic; with influences from many other genres and mediums, for example, Charleston, swing, psychedelia, metal, acid house, cut-up poetry and found sounds.  His sounds has been described to contain various styles of music such as alternative rock, bedroom pop, electronic, electronica, carnival, synthpop, indie rock, post-punk revival, neo-psychedelia, new wave and alternative dance. Tracks by Whitey have also featured in episodes of The Sopranos and Kyle XY.

Career

The Light at the End of the Tunnel is a Train and shelved albums (2005–2008)
In 2005, he released an album named The Light at the End of the Tunnel is a Train. Though he himself has subsequently distanced himself from the genre, this album predicted many elements of the 'electro-rock' movement by several years, and was greeted at the time as a critical triumph, going on to make numerous Best Of Year lists worldwide.

In the summer of 2007, an album named Great Shakes was leaked onto the internet, by an unidentified individual named Kelkoo182. As a consequence of this leak, this album was never officially released, and Whitey lost all international licensing deals. On 9 October 2007, the Wrap It Up EP was released through Pure Groove Music/Universal Music. It consisted of three songs: Wrap It Up, Cigarette, and Head in the Corner. Other appearances since then have been the track "Stay on the Outside" on Kitsuné Maison Compilation 4, the release of the limited edition Made of Night EP on Marquis Cha Cha records and the track "Wrap It Up" was featured on Grand Theft Auto IV on the in-game radio station Radio Broker. A full album named Stay On The Outside was planned for release in the later part of 2008, but was delayed at this point by the artist. This album was planned to include a number of tracks from Great Shakes and a number of new tracks.

Canned Laughter, Great Shakes, Lost Summer, and Seven (2010–2015)
A new album Canned Laughter was self-released by Whitey on 1 April 2010, along with a public statement that the 'future of music is independent, and labels must learn to strike fairer deals to keep their slice'. He then withdrew all his music from Spotify and iTunes, but has since returned to these platforms.

On 23 March 2012, extended versions of The Light at the End of the Tunnel is a Train & Canned Laughter was independently released via Bandcamp, alongside the first official release of Great Shakes & a collection of rarities named "Great Shakes Volume 2."

In May 2012, Whitey announced a surprise release- his new album "Lost Summer" was suddenly released a week later, independently on Bandcamp. The album went live for download on 18 May 2012. Music from this has been used extensively in US TV and cinema.
The song "Stay On the Outside" was used in episode two of the fifth season of Breaking Bad.

In December 2012, Whitey started a Kickstarter campaign to fund his seventh album as well as making physical releases on CD and vinyl available for all his back catalog. The Kickstarter campaign ended well over the official goal. However, as of September 2018 no album had been released to those who had pledged funds to the campaign.

In November 2013, Whitey rejected a Betty TV request to license his music for free on the grounds that it was unreasonable to pay others professionally without paying to license music, reposting the email online to begin 'a public discussion... about this kind of industry abuse of musicians.' The post went viral overnight, generating 500,000 views in the first 24 hours, and reached an estimated audience of over 5 million views via retweeting/secondary views on Twitter. The requested discussion spread into the mainstream press, generating pieces in Music Week, The Guardian, the BBC and numerous online sources. Whitey recently passed his 15 millionth online play.

In March 2015, Whitey released "Seven," a mini-album consisting of seven songs crossing and blending seven multiple genres. Whitey also announced a new studio album titled "Square Peg, Round World", though this album was ultimately shelved.

Return to music (2020–present)
On 29 May 2020, Whitey released a Facebook post announcing his return to music, along with releases of all of his previous albums on CD, Vinyl and digital streaming platforms. A new album titled "Now That's Why I Killed Music", featuring previously unreleased or rare tracks, was released on 7 August 2020. Not long after, an Extended Version including 2 Unreleased tracks was released of the album as a Bandcamp exclusive.

On 25 October 2020, Whitey released "The Times They Are Deranging E.P", his first E.P since Made Of Night E.P in 2008. It Contains 4 tracks, 2 of which originally were meant to appear on Square Peg, Round World. Over the course of late 2020, and early 2021, Whitey has self published a further 3 albums, of unreleased tracks, to his Bandcamp page.

Discography

Studio albums
The Light at the End of the Tunnel Is a Train (2005)
Great Shakes (2007)
Canned Laughter (2010)
Lost Summer (2012)
Seven (2015)
Now That's Why I Killed Music (2020)

References

External links
 Official page on Myspace
 Bandcamp page

Musicians from London
Kitsuné
British electronic musicians
Living people
Year of birth missing (living people)
Musicians from Coventry
21st-century English musicians